Indonesia and Vietnam established diplomatic relations in 1955. Indonesia has an embassy in Hanoi. Vietnam has an embassy in Jakarta. Both are neighboring nations that have a maritime border which lies on the South China Sea and are members of ASEAN and APEC.

History
The relations between ancient Indonesia and Vietnam, particularly Southern Vietnam, began around the 7th century, since the era of the Champa, Srivijaya, and later Majapahit kingdoms. In mid-11th century, Vietnamese king Ly Thanh Tong (r. 1054–1071) was said to have purchased a precious pearl from a Javanese merchant. A Majapahit epic poem called Nagarakretagama mentioned several states that is today Vietnam: Champa and Yawana (Đại Việt). Indonesian 15th century records mentioned Princess Darawati, a Cham princess, married to King Kertawijaya, Majapahit's seventh ruler. The tomb of Putri Champa (Princess of Champa) can be found in Trowulan, East Java, the site of Majapahit capital. From the 15th to 17th century, Muslim Cham maintains a cordial relationship with Aceh Sultanate.

Post-independence
While informal diplomatic relations originated in the 1940s, formal diplomatic ties was only established following the 1955 Bandung Conference. Indonesia established consulate-generals in Hanoi and Saigon on December and September of that year. While initially keeping neutral between the North and South parties, Indonesia's government under Sukarno grew to favor the communist North Vietnam. Ho Chi Minh visited Indonesia in 1959 and Sukarno visited back the following year. Eventually, on 10 August 1964 an embassy was established in Hanoi, which resulted in severance of diplomatic ties with South Vietnam and closure of the Saigon consulate. This embassy was maintained even as Suharto took power.

On 28 July 1995, Vietnam became the seventh member of ASEAN. The bilateral cooperation through ASEAN has been promoted ever since.

High level visits

In February 1959, North Vietnamese President Ho Chi Minh visited Indonesia, reciprocated by President Sukarno visit to North Vietnam in June on the same year. In November 1990 President Suharto visited Vietnam. In April 1994 President Lê Đức Anh visited Indonesia. Indonesian President Megawati Sukarnoputri visited Hanoi on 22 August 2001, and also in June 2003, reciprocated by President Trần Đức Lương visit to Jakarta in November 2001. Indonesian President Susilo Bambang Yudhoyono visited Hanoi on 28 May 2005. On 27 June 2013, Vietnamese President Trương Tấn Sang visited Indonesia and paid a courtesy call to his Indonesian counterpart, Susilo Bambang Yudhoyono, to strengthen bilateral relations and deepen cooperation in key sectors, as well as agreeing to establish a strategic partnership. in December 2022, Vietnamese President Nguyễn Xuân Phúc visit Indonesia to deepen cooperation and finalize the demarcation on both of the Maritime Borders.

Tourism
In 2016, about 50,000 Vietnamese tourists visited Indonesia, with 70,000 Indonesians coming to Vietnam.

Territorial disputes
Indonesia and Vietnam currently do not have territorial disputes. However, addressing the territorial disputes in the South China Sea, Indonesia supports and urges ASEAN nations (including Vietnam and the Philippines) to unite and reaffirm the Declaration on the Conduct (DOC) of parties involved, the need to reaffirm the guidelines, Code of Conduct (COC) in the East Sea (South China Sea), and the need to respect international laws and the United Nations Convention on the Law of the Sea (UNCLOS).

In more recent years, Vietnamese fishing vessels captured for allegedly fishing in the Indonesian Exclusive Economic Zone have been sunk, with 96 ships being sunk throughout 2016, making it the most compared to other countries. The Indonesian President expressed his desire to resolve EEZ issues to his Vietnamese counterpart during the 2017 G20 Hamburg summit, of which Vietnam was a guest.

In late 2022, during the state visit of Vietnamese President Nguyễn Xuân Phúc to Indonesia, the two nations' heads of state have announced that the two parties have concluded negotiations relate to the demarcation of EEZ boundaries . Even though the formal agreement is yet to be signed, it is expected to effectively end Vietnam and Indonesia's concerns & clashes in the area and encourage both countries to be more united to deal with China's aggression in the South China Sea.

See also 
 Indonesia–Vietnam border

External links 
 Embassy of the Republic of Indonesia in Hanoi, the Socialist Republic of Vietnam
 The Socialist Republic of Vietnam Embassy, Jakarta, Indonesia

Notes 

 
Vietnam
Bilateral relations of Vietnam